Vladimir Isaakovich Lantsberg (1948–2005) was a Russian poet, songwriter, bard, and teacher.
Vladimir Lantsberg was born on June 22, 1948, in the city of Saratov. In 1971, he graduated from Saratov Polytechnical Institute. He worked as a mechanical engineer until 1979, when he moved to Tuapse. Lantsberg held many jobs—a video game machine engineer, a lab manager in a school, a musician in a resort, etc. Additionally, he was a guitar player who wrote and performed his own songs. Lantsberg became a laureate of many KSP festivals, including four times laureate of the Grushinsky festival. He published several audiotapes, compact disсs, and books with poetry and songs.

Lantsberg died on September 29, 2005, in Nuremberg after prolonged illness.

1948 births
2005 deaths
Russian male poets
Russian Jews
Jewish poets
Russian bards
20th-century Russian singers